Warwick is a town and locality in southeast Queensland, Australia, lying  south-west of Brisbane. It is the administrative centre of the Southern Downs Region local government area. The surrounding Darling Downs have fostered a strong agricultural industry for which Warwick, together with the larger city of Toowoomba, serve as convenient service centres. The town had an urban population of 15,380 as at June 2018, having declined slightly at an average annual rate of -0.15% year-on-year over the preceding five years.

Geography
The Condamine River meanders from the east to the north-west of Warwick. One of its tributaries, Rosenthal Creek, enters Warwick from the south and enters the Condamine within Warwick.

The Cunningham Highway and the New England Highway jointly enter Warwick from the north, cross the Condamine River, and then turn west within the town close to the Warwick central business district. The Cunningham Highway then continues west towards Goondiwindi, while the New England Highway heads south towards Stanthorpe.

The Condamine River often floods, which can disconnect the northern and southern parts of Warwick and close the highways. Gauges that measure river height are used to provide flood alerts to residents. Low-lying land around the river is mostly used for recreation to minimise the damage caused by flooding with most developed areas at higher levels. Queens Park is a major park based around the river and the highway crossing.

The Warwick central business district is laid out on a grid pattern and lies within one or two blocks of the long main street, Palmerin Street with Grafton Street the major cross-street. The statue of former Queensland Premier Thomas Byrnes is located at their intersection.

History

The Githabal (also known as Gidabal, Kitabal) language region includes the landscape within the local government boundaries of the Southern Downs Regional Council, particularly Warwick, Killarney and Woodenbong extending into New South Wales.

The Warwick Green Belt, on the banks of the Condamine River, features a sculpture of Tiddalik the mythical frog that drank all of the fresh water in a renowned Aboriginal Dreamtime story.

Patrick Leslie and his two brothers originally settled in the area as squatters, naming their run Canning Downs. In 1847 the NSW government asked Leslie to select a site on his station for a township, which was to be called 'Cannington,' although the name 'Warwick' was eventually settled on. Land sales were held in 1850, and the first allotment was bought by Leslie.

Warwick East State School opened on 4 November 1850. It is one of the oldest state primary schools in Queensland.

In 1851 the first Presbyterian services were held in Warwick. Land was granted to build a Presbyterian church in 1857 and a slab church was built in 1858.

The telegraph to Brisbane was operating by 1861.

Warwick Central State School opened on 26 July 1865.

Miss O'Mara opened a school on 27 January 1867 in the Oddfellows Hall.

The 1870s were boom years for this new town. In 1871 the Southern railway line reached Warwick, a brewery was built in 1873, then a cooperative flour mill and brickworks were completed during 1874.

On 29 October 1874, the Sisters of Mercy took over Miss O'Mara's school at the Oddfellows Hall renaming it St Mary's School.

Warwick was the seat of a series of local government areas, the Borough of Warwick from 1861, Town of Warwick from 1903, City of Warwick from 1936, Shire of Warwick from 1994, and Southern Downs Region from 2008.

In 1877,  of land was resumed from the Canning Downs pastoral run to establish smaller farms. The land was offered for selection on 19 April 1877.

In 1878 the Queensland Government raised a loan of £5,000 to build a new hospital in Warwick. However, it was not until September 1880 after considerable local agitation that the government called for tenders to build the hospital, resulting in a contract awarded to A.W. Doorey to build the hospital. However, by February 1881, tenders were being called for again, and in April 1881 the Queensland Government announced the hospital would not proceed. In June 1881, the government indicated that they would proceed if the local financial subscriptions to the hospital were increased. Tenders were called again in February 1882 resulting in a contract with Messrs Wallace and Gibson in March 1882. Finally on Thursday 19 June 1884, the patients were moved from the old hospital to the new hospital in Locke Street.

In 1893, the Sisters of Mercy relocated their convent and St Mary's School to the newly constructed Our Lady of the Assumption Convent in Locke Street.

The T J Byrnes Monument (a statue of the 12th Queensland Premier Thomas Joseph Byrnes) was built on the corner of Palmerin and Grafton Streets. The monument was built from 1901 to 1902 and was officially unveiled on Saturday 13 December 1902 by the Governor of Queensland, Sir Herbert Chermside. The unveiling of the monument was an important occasion for Warwick.

In 1912, a Baptist church opened in Warwick. The building had been completed by August 1912.

Warwick State High School opened on 1 February 1912. It is one of the oldest state secondary schools in Queensland.

St Mary's School also expanded, creating a secondary school called Assumption College in 1912, and in 1914 enlarging the convent to accommodate the growing secondary school.

Lyndhurst State School opened in January 1913, but was quickly renamed Mount Gordon State School. It closed in 1985. The school was located on the corner of Wood Street and Parker Street.

On 29 November 1917, the Warwick Incident occurred, which would lead to the formation of the Australian Commonwealth Police with the first commissioner for Commonwealth Police appointed eight days later. As Prime Minister William Morris Hughes was addressing a crowd at the Warwick railway station, a man in the crowd threw an egg dislodging the Prime Minister's hat. Hughes ordered his arrest but the Queensland State policeman present refused to carry out the orders saying that Hughes had no authority over him.

In February 1918 the Church of England High School for Girls opened with over 40 students. The school was operated by the Sisters of the Sacred Advent and the first headmistress was Miss Margaret Brown.

In February 1918 the Presbyterian Girls College (PGC) opened in an existing house "Glenbrae" on over five acres in Locke Street, as a boarding and day school with 53 girls under headmistress Miss Constance Mackness (who retired in 1949, the longest serving headmistress of the school). The school was established by local families who did not want to have to send their daughters to Toowoomba for a Presbyterian education.

In 1918, to meet the need for Presbyterian education for boys, the Scots College opened as a Presbyterian boarding and day for boys in an existing house "Arranmore" on the banks of the Condamine River under headmaster James Logan Briggs.

The Warwick War Memorial was built in 1923 and the memorial gates were built in 1924.

Slade School opened on 30 January 1926 in the house "Eastmont" (now known as "Slade House") on the ridge on the northern side of the Condamine River. The school was operated by the Bush Brotherhood. In 1977 it merged with St Catherine's Anglican School (a school for girls operated by the Sisters of the Sacred Advent). The school closed in 1997. In 2000 the site was purchased by the Anglican Church Grammar School (based in Brisbane), becoming their Slade Campus. However they decided to close the campus in 2005 saying it was not economically viable. In 2007 the site was purchased by the local council. In 2013 the site was purchased by the Warwick Christian College which commenced operations in 2014.

Although the Queensland Government had architectural plans for a Baby Clinic in Warwick from at least 1923, it was not until Friday 21 February 1930 that the Warwick Baby Clinic was officially opened by Home Secretary J.C. Peterson. The building cost about £2,000 and was built on land donated by the Warwick ambulance brigade. The purpose of baby clinics was to prevent disease in early childhood and the Warwick Baby Clinic was the 15th built in Queensland.

During World War II, the 2/12th Army General Hospital took over the Scots College buildings and grounds in Oxenham Street, with the school relocating to Kingswood and Toolburra.

Warwick West State School opened on 31 January 1956.

Glennie Heights State School opened on 25 January 1960.

The current Warwick Public Library opened in 1964 with a major refurbishment in 1999.

St John's Anglican Church at Thane closed circa 1968. The church was relocated to the Mile End Park, 177 Pratten Street in west Warwick where it continues to operate as St John's Anglican Church.

In 1970, the Presbyterian Girls College and The Scots College merged into a co-educational school called Scots PGC College.

On 5 February 1981, The School of Total Education was established in Warwick by Vijayadev Yogendra (1930–2005). Yogendra was a yoga teacher and educationalist, the son of Shri Yogendra (who in 1918 founded the Yoga Institute in India). The school aimed to develop children through spiritual and emotional growth to additional to physical and intellectual development.

St Mary's School opened its Upper Campus in 2002.

In 2007, Warwick Christian College was established by the Christian Community Ministries.

Facilities 
The Southern Downs Regional Council operates a public library in Warwick at 49 Albion Street.

The Condamine Valley branch of the Queensland Country Women's Association has its rooms at 76 Grafton Street.

Warwick Wesleyan Methodist Church is at 126 Wood Street. It is part of the Wesleyan Methodist Church of Australia.

Education 
Warwick East State School is a government primary (Prep-6) school for boys and girls at Fitzroy Street. In 2017, the school had an enrolment of 217 students with 20 teachers (18 full-time equivalent) and 17 non-teaching staff (11 full-time equivalent). It includes a special education program.

Warwick Central State School is a government primary (Prep-6) school for boys and girls at the corner of Guy and Percy Streets. In 2017, the school had an enrolment of 281 students with 22 teachers (20 full-time equivalent) and 16 non-teaching staff (10 full-time equivalent). It includes a special education program.

Warwick West State School is a government primary (Early Childhood-6) school for boys and girls at 17 George Street. In 2017, the school had an enrolment of 507 students with 47 teachers (40 full-time equivalent) and 33 non-teaching staff (21 full-time equivalent). It includes a special education program.

Glennie Heights State School is a government primary (Prep-6) school for boys and girls at 5–12 Gillam Street. In 2017, the school had an enrolment of 177 students with 19 teachers (15 full-time equivalent) and 10 non-teaching staff (7 full-time equivalent). It includes a special education program.

Warwick State High School is a government secondary (7–12) school for boys and girls at Palmerin Street. In 2017, the school had an enrolment of 884 students with 88 teachers (80 full-time equivalent) and 53 non-teaching staff (38 full-time equivalent). It includes a special education program.

St Mary's School is a Catholic primary (Prep-6) school for boys and girls with two campuses, one at 163 Palmerin Street for the younger children and the other for older children at 175 Palmerin Street. In 2017, the school had a total enrolment of 324 students with 29 teachers (20 full-time equivalent) and 17 non-teaching staff (8 full-time equivalent).

Assumption College is a Catholic secondary (7–12) school for boys and girls at 6 Locke Street. In 2017, the school had an enrolment of 441 students with 36 teachers (34 full-time equivalent) and 20 non-teaching staff (15 full-time equivalent).

The Scots PGC College is a private primary and secondary (Prep-12) school for boys and girls at 60 Oxenham Street. In 2017, the school had an enrolment of 359 students with 37 teachers (36 full-time equivalent) and 35 non-teaching staff (24 full-time equivalent).

Warwick Christian College is a private primary and secondary (Prep-11) school for boys and girls at 70 Horsman Road. In 2017, the school had an enrolment of 134 students with 13 teachers (10 full-time equivalent) and 16 non-teaching staff (8 full-time equivalent). The school has a special assistance campus at 62 Canningvale Road.

The School of Total Education is a private primary and secondary (Prep-12) school for boys and girls at 2 Freestone Road. In 2017, the school had an enrolment of 109 students with 25 teachers (16 full-time equivalent) and 11 non-teaching staff (6 full-time equivalent).

Communications 

Newspapers in Warwick include the Warwick Daily News, the Warwick and Southern Downs Weekly and the Southern Free Times. Former newspapers include the Warwick Argus which was published from 1879 to 1919, the Warwick Argus and Tenterfield Chronicle and the Warwick Examiner and Times.  Radio station 4WK was established in May 1935. Its coverage was gradually extended to Toowoomba, Pittsworth, Millmerran, Clifton, Allora, Stanthorpe, Crows Nest, Highfields, Dalby, Oakey, Tara, Goondiwindi, Boonah, and Esk. It now broadcasts from Toowoomba.

Warwick's Community Radio Station started transmissions in 1995 as 'Rainbow FM' and had the callsign 4CCC. The callsign was later changed to 4SDB by the ACMA and the name of the station was changed on 1 January 2019 to 'Rose City FM' to reflect its Warwick roots. It operates as a continuous service by a team of local volunteers. The operating body is incorporated as the "Warwick Community FM Radio Inc." It transmits on 89.3 MHz with an Effective Radiated power of 2000W (2000W ERP) from its studios in the building that had previously housed the Rosenthal Shire Council in Willi Street, Warwick. The station has the support of the Southern Downs Regional Council (SDRC) and the Warwick community as well as many listeners online that listen through its Internet stream from its website.

Sport
Warwick has a rugby union team which compete in the Darling Downs Rugby Union competition. The Warwick Cowboys, coached by one-time champion NRL coach Phil Economidis, play in the Toowoomba Rugby League.

Warwick has an Australian rules football club, the Warwick Redbacks competing in the AFL Darling Downs competition since 1999, the Redbacks won their first premiership in 2014.

Warwick has hosted a local Parkrun event since 2013.

Attractions 

 The Pringle Cottage Museum complex operated by the Warwick Historical Society
Glengallan Homestead
 Warwick Art Gallery

Heritage listings 

Warwick has many heritage-listed buildings, including those listed on:
 the Commonwealth Heritage List
 98 Palmerin Street: Warwick Post Office
 the Queensland Heritage Register
List of sites on the Queensland Heritage Register in Warwick

Events 

 Warwick Agricultural Show (March)
 FEI Eventing World Cup (May)
Jumpers and Jazz in July Festival (July)
The "Rose Bowl" Polocrosse Carnival (August)
Warwick Trots (Harness Racing) (Darling Downs Harness Racing Club at Allman Park Racecourse) Father's Day, September 
Warwick Cup (Thoroughbred Horse Racing) (Warwick Turf Club at Allman Park Racecourse) October
Warwick Rodeo (October)
Rose Festival (October)

Climate
Warwick has a humid subtropical climate (Köppen Cfa) with hot summers and mild winters. It is slightly cooler and less humid than the proximate southeast Queensland coast due to its inland, elevated location. Frost is present in winter. 
The climate bears similarities with Richmond, an inland suburb of Sydney, in Central-Eastern New South Wales.

Notable people
Notable people with a connection to Warwick include

Francis Andersen, Australian scholar in the fields of biblical studies and Hebrew, born in Warwick
Wayne Bennett, rugby league player and coach, raised in and played rugby league in Warwick
Anna Bligh, 37th Premier of Queensland, born in Warwick
Lee Bodimeade, hockey player, born in Warwick
Dean Butler, hockey player, born in Warwick
Thomas Joseph Byrnes, former Premier of Queensland, Member of the Legislative Assembly for Warwick
Matt Campbell racing car driver
Charles Chauvel, filmmaker, born in Warwick
Cyril Clowes, lieutenant general, born in Warwick
John Harward, esteemed scholar of ancient Greek and translator of Plato. Retired here in 1915. 
Dion Leonard, ultramarathon runner and international bestselling author, grew up in Warwick
Patrick Leslie, pioneer settler in Warwick
Alan Marshall, cricket player, born in Warwick
Mervyn Meggitt, anthropologist, born in Warwick
Arthur Morgan, former Premier of Queensland, born in Warwick and Member of the Legislative Assembly for Warwick
Paul Neville, politician, born in Warwick
Adrienne Pickering, actress, born in Warwick
Chris Pickering, musician, born and raised in Warwick
Russell Skerman, Supreme Court Judge, attended Warwick High School
Mark Steketee, Cricket player from Warwick
Duncan Thompson, Australian rugby league footballer, coach and administrator, born in Warwick
Elizabeth Catherine Usher AO (1911–1996), pioneering speech therapist, grew up in Warwick
William Webb, judge, attended school in Warwick

Sister cities 
  Whakatane, New Zealand, Since 1994

See also

References

Further reading
 Heritage Trails of Great South East by the Queensland Environmental Protection Agency
 Local Government Reform Commission, http://www.dlgp.qld.gov.au/resources/map/reform/southern-downs-rationale.pdf (8/3/2010)
  – full text available online

External links 

 
 Views of Warwick, State Library of Queensland

 
Populated places established in 1850
1850 establishments in Australia
Localities in Queensland